Frauenmoral (English: Women's Morals) is a 1923 German-Dutch silent film directed by Theo Frenkel.

Cast
 Olga Engl
 Helena Makowska – Jane Williams
 Theo Mann-Bouwmeester – Jane's stiefmoeder
 Fritz Marion
 Oskar Marion – John Ayre
 Anton Pointner – Harry Robinson jr.
 Coen Hissink – Jane's stiefbroer
 Harry Hardt
 Lili Alexandra
 Adolf Klein – Henry Robinson sr.
 Willy Kaiser-Heyl

References

External links 
 

1923 films
Dutch silent feature films
German silent feature films
Dutch black-and-white films
German black-and-white films
Films of the Weimar Republic
Films directed by Theo Frenkel
1920s German films